Vinacomin (Vietnam National Coal and Mineral Industries Group) is a Vietnamese mining company. The industrial conglomerate focuses on coal and mineral mining and has headquarters in Hạ Long, Quảng Ninh Province.

History
Vinacomin was created by the merger of the Vietnam Coal Corporation (Vinacoal) and Vietnam Minerals Corporation. Vinacoal was established in 1995 through the merger of all Vietnam's coal exploitation and processing companies.

Operations
Vinacomin operates within many different sectors, such as coal exploitation, processing and selling, explosive and cement production, shipbuilding, automobile manufacturing, tourism, hotels, financing, services and power generation in thermal power plants, including the Cao Ngan thermal power station (the main contractor being China's Harbin) and Na Duong thermal power station (the main contractor being Japan's Marubeni).

Vinacomin currently has five open-pit mines with a capacity of more than 2 million tonnes, including Cao Son, Deo Nai, Coc 6, Ha Tu and Nui Beo. It also has 15 other open-pit mines with a processing capacity of 100,000 tonnes to 1 million tonnes per year.

Vinacomin plans in cooperation with Marubeni and Linc Energy of Australia to exploit bituminous coal reserves in the Song Hong Delta using underground coal gasification technology.

Vinacomin conducts mining operations on one of the world's largest bauxite deposits in the Central Highlands region.

See also
Coal mining
Energy in Vietnam
Bauxite mining in Vietnam

References

External links
Vinacomin CaoSon Coal JSC at Hanoi Securities Trading Center
Vinacomin Coc Sau Coal JSC at Hanoi Securities Trading Center
Vinacomin DeoNai Coal JSC at Hanoi Securities Trading Center
Vinacomin Nui Beo Coal JSC at Hanoi Securities Trading Center

Companies listed on the Hanoi Stock Exchange
Coal companies of Vietnam
Companies established in 1995